Joachim Ernst, Margrave of Brandenburg-Ansbach (22 June 1583, in Cölln an der Spree – 7 March 1625, in Ansbach) was a German nobleman.  He ruled as margrave of Brandenburg-Ansbach from 1603 to 1625, succeeding his cousin George Frederick and succeeded by his son Frederick III.

Life

Youth 

Joachim Ernst was the son of the elector John George of Brandenburg and his third wife, Elisabeth of Anhalt-Zerbst. He travelled in England and Scotland in 1599.

He took over in 1603, the government of the Margraviate of Brandenburg-Ansbach, after the old line of Franconian Hohenzollerns died out with the death of George Fredrick the Elder of the Ansbach-Jägerndorf branch.  Joachim Ernst founded the younger branch of Ansbach line of the Franconian Hohenzollerns.

Succession rules 

His predecessor, George Frederick had settled the succession of his two Franconian possessions (Brandenburg-Ansbach and Brandenburg-Kulmbach) in the House Treaty of Gera of 1598.  In accordance with the provisions of this treaty, Margrave Joachim Ernst ruled Brandenburg-Ansbach and his brother Christian ruled neighboring Brandenburg-Kulmbach (Christian later moved his capital to Bayreuth, thereby changing its name to Brandenburg-Bayreuth).

Protestant Union 
In the religious conflicts of the early 17th Century, Joachim Ernst tended to be in the Protestant-Calvinist camp and he also supported the Dutch struggle for independence.  He took an active part in bringing about the Protestant Alliance of the Protestant Union, which was founded in 1608 on his territory, in the secularized monastery at Auhausen, near Nördlingen.  The Union was, however, dissolved again in 1621, after the outbreak of the Thirty Years' War, in view of the military superiority of the imperial camp. After the dissolution of the Union, Joachim Ernst was held responsible for the outbreak of war by his Catholic opponents and he then completely distanced himself from his former allies.

Marriage and issue 
In 1612, he married Sophie of Solms-Laubach (1594–1651).  They had five children:
 Sophie (1614–1646)
 married in 1641 Margrave Erdmann August of Brandenburg-Bayreuth (1615–1651)
 Frederick III (1616–1634), Margrave of Brandenburg-Ansbach
 Albert (1617)
 Albert II (1620–1667), Margrave of Brandenburg-Ansbach
 married firstly in 1642 Princess Henriette Louise of Württemberg-Mömpelgard (1623–1650)
 married secondly in 1651 Countess Sophia Margaret of Oettingen-Oettingen (1634–1664)
 married thirdly in 1665 Princess Christine of Baden-Durlach (1645–1705)
 Christian (1623–1633)

Ancestors

References 

 Gerhard Taddey: Lexikon der deutschen Geschichte, Stuttgart, 1998, 
 M. Spindler, A. Kraus: Geschichte Frankens bis zum Ausgang des 18. Jahrhunderts, München, 1997, 
 Hans-Jörg Herold: Markgraf Joachim Ernst von Brandenburg-Ansbach als Reichsfürst, Göttingen, 1973,  (Issue 10 of the Schriftenreihe der Historischen Kommission bei der Bayerischen Akademie der Wissenschaften)

External links 
 
 
 

1583 births
1625 deaths
Margraves of Brandenburg-Ansbach
House of Hohenzollern
Burials at Heilsbronn Abbey